Rodrigo de Souza Fonseca (born 27 October 1987 in São Gonçalo), better known as Rodrigo Souza, is a Brazilian footballer who plays as a defensive midfielder for São Bernardo.

Honours
Madureira
 Copa Rio: 2011

Cruzeiro
 Campeonato Mineiro: 2014

São Bernardo
 Campeonato Paulista Série A2: 2021

External links
 Official Cruzeiro website 
 

1987 births
Living people
Brazilian footballers
Brazilian expatriate footballers
Duque de Caxias Futebol Clube players
Can Tho FC players
Sampaio Corrêa Futebol Clube players
Boa Esporte Clube players
Cruzeiro Esporte Clube players
Criciúma Esporte Clube players
Clube Atlético Penapolense players
América Futebol Clube (MG) players
Clube Náutico Capibaribe players
Clube de Regatas Brasil players
Nacional Atlético Clube (SP) players
Oeste Futebol Clube players
São Bernardo Futebol Clube players
Campeonato Brasileiro Série A players
Campeonato Brasileiro Série B players
Campeonato Brasileiro Série C players
Association football goalkeepers
Brazilian expatriate sportspeople in Vietnam
Expatriate footballers in Vietnam
People from São Gonçalo, Rio de Janeiro
Sportspeople from Rio de Janeiro (state)